The 2013 Dow Corning Tennis Classic was a professional tennis tournament played on indoor hard courts. It was the nineteenth edition of the tournament which was part of the 2013 ITF Women's Circuit, offering a total of $100,000 in prize money. It took place in Midland, Michigan, United States, on February 4–10, 2013.

Women's singles main draw entrants

Seeds 

 1 Rankings as of January 28, 2013

Other entrants 
The following players received wildcards into the singles main draw:
  Anne-Liz Jeukeng
  Asia Muhammad

The following players received entry from the qualifying draw:
  Chieh-Yu Hsu
  Alexandra Mueller
  Alexandra Stevenson
  Sachia Vickery

The following players received entry into the singles main draw as lucky losers:
  Maria Fernanda Alves
  Victoria Duval

The following player received entry by a Protected Ranking:
  Ajla Tomljanović

The following player received entry through Junior Exempt:
  Taylor Townsend

Champions

Singles 

  Lauren Davis def.  Ajla Tomljanović 6–3, 2–6, 7–6(7–2)

Doubles 

  Melinda Czink /  Mirjana Lučić-Baroni def.  Maria Fernanda Alves /  Samantha Murray 5–7, 6–4, [10–7]

External links 
 2013 Dow Corning Tennis Classic at ITFtennis.com
 Official website

2013